The sad miner bee (Andrena pertristis) is a species of miner bee in the family Andrenidae. Another common name for this species is the mournful miner. It is found in North America.

Subspecies
These two subspecies belong to the species Andrena pertristis:
 Andrena pertristis carliniformis Viereck & Cockerell, 1914
 Andrena pertristis pertristis Cockerell, 1905 (black mournful miner)

References

Further reading

 
 

pertristis
Articles created by Qbugbot
Insects described in 1905